Azygophleps afghanistanensis is a moth in the family Cossidae. It is found in Afghanistan.

References

Moths described in 1964
Azygophleps